This is a list of the NCAA Division I women's basketball tournament regional championships by coach. Unlike the men's tournament that uses directions for names, the current names of the NCAA tournament regions are the name of the city that is to host said region. The winners of the four regions are awarded an NCAA Regional Championship Trophy and advance in the Division I women's basketball tournament to play in the Final Four.

Final Four appearances by coach
 Coaches with vacated Final Four appearances due to NCAA violations are marked with an * next to the year. The listed Final Four totals for those coaches do not include the vacated appearances.
 Coaches with names in bold are active with a team that they took to a Final Four.
 Coaches with names in bold italics are active in NCAA Division I, but are not currently coaching a team that they took to a Final Four.
 Years in bold indicate national championship.
 All school names reflect current athletic brand names, which do not necessarily match those in use during a particular season.

Coaches with multiple NCAA Division I Championships
This is a list of NCAA women's basketball coaches who have won multiple championships. This list includes only championships since 1982.

References
 2023 NCAA Record Book - Coaches

Notes

College women's basketball records and statistics in the United States
Coach